Satinder Kumar Lambah (16 July 1941 – 30 June 2022), also known as Sati Lambah, was an Indian civil servant of 1964 batch of Indian Foreign Service cadre who served as the Prime Minister of India's Special envoy for Afghanistan and Pakistan between 2005 and 2014. He is also known for building a Strategic partnership agreement with Russia when he was an envoy in Moscow between 1998 and 2001.

Satinder Lambah was honoured with the Order of Merit of the Federal Republic of Germany for promoting Germany–India relations in December 2015.

Early life 
He was born in 1941 in Peshawar (present-day in Pakistan).

Career 
He joined the Indian Foreign Service in 1964. He spent more than four decades in a diplomatic career, working in several Indian missions worldwide. He has served as the Ambassador of India to Hungary from 1986 to 1989, High Commissioner of India to Pakistan from 1992 to 1995 and Ambassador of India to Germany from 1995 to 1998. From 1989 to 1991, he was the Consul General of India in San Francisco, USA. He has also held the post of India's Deputy High Commissioner (1978–81) and High Commissioner (1992–95) to Pakistan and also served as the Joint Secretary (Pakistan, Afghanistan, Iran).

While serving as the Ambassador of India to Hungary, Satinder K Lambah played an important role in the first export of an Indian car, Maruti to Budapest. In 2001, he played a key role in Indian investments in the Russian oil field Sakhalin-I.

He was appointed the Deputy Secretary-General of the 7th Summit of the Non-Aligned Movement, which was held in New Delhi in March 1983. Later, he was the Coordinator of the Commonwealth Heads of Government Meeting in India.  His specialization has been in economic diplomacy and dealing with neighbouring countries of India. He helped in setting up the Indian Embassy in Bangladesh after the Liberation of Bangladesh from Pakistan.

In August 2001, he retired from the Indian Foreign Service.  After retirement, Satinder K Lambah chaired a Committee on the Reorganization of the Ministry of External Affairs and India's Missions Abroad. From November 2001 to July 2002, he served as the India's special envoy for Afghanistan. He was the Convener of the National Security Advisory Board (NSAB) Government of India from 2004 to 2005. During 2011–12, he was co-chairman of the Task Force on National Security. In 2011, he was appointed the co-chairman of the Task Force on National Security, where he held office until 2012. In August 2015, he was elected as the chairman of the Ananta Aspen Centre, a not-for-profit think tank.

Honours
  Order of Merit of the Federal Republic of Germany (2015)

Death 
He died on 30 June 2022 at the age of 80 in New Delhi.

References

External links 
 “India Does Not Need Anyone To Give It An Afghan Role. It Has One By Virtue Of Its History.” with Outlook India
 Manmohan Singh bequeathed a larger legacy than he inherited for a settlement on Kashmir: Satinder Lambah with The Economic Times
 Pakistan, India came close to ink Kashmir accord in 2007: Ex-envoy at Geo TV

1941 births
2022 deaths
Indian Foreign Service officers
High Commissioners of India to Pakistan
Ambassadors of India to Hungary
Ambassadors of India to Germany
Ambassadors of India to Russia
Recipients of the Order of Merit of the Federal Republic of Germany
People from Peshawar